Medusa are a rock/punk band, based in London, UK, led by Julian Molinero. They have had numerous line-ups but have consistently been a three-piece group.

History 

Formed in Blackburn, Lancashire in spring 1998, by guitarist and vocalist Julian Molinero whilst still at school.

Over the next several years, the band went through many line up changes and claimed to have been banned from the majority of venues they played in the early years.

The band finally recorded their debut album, Medusa, in 2006. The second album Can't Fucking Win was released in March 2011.

Their second music video, to the track Tinkerbell, features intoxicated dwarf Josh Bennett, a reality TV star from the Channel 4 show Seven Dwarves, dressed as an Oompa Loompa on a drunken limousine ride with the band. In 2014, the band released their third album Headcase's Handbook, produced by Deaf Havana producer Lee Batiuk.

In 2016 and 2017, the band headlined monthly shows in London, as well as playing gigs at a few other towns in England.

Neal "Snell" Eldridge joined the band as the new drummer in late 2019; best known as the drummer from Towers of London but whom had also played drums for the Prodigy.

They recorded their fourth album In Bed with Medusa with Steve Albini at his studio Electrical Audio. It was released in February 2020.

The band played on the main stage at the O2 Academy, Sheffield on 2nd October, 2021 at the HRH Punk Festival.

Discography

Albums 
 Medusa (2006)
 Can't Fucking Win (2011)
 Headcase's Handbook (2014)
 In Bed with Medusa (2020)

References

English punk rock groups
Musical groups from Lancashire
Musical groups from London
British musical trios